Darine Hotait is an American film director and writer of Lebanese descent. She is best known for her short films, I Say Dust, Like Salt, Tallahassee, and Sherman.

Early life and education
Darine Hotait was born in Beirut, Lebanon. At an early age, her family emigrated to the United States of America. She graduated with an MFA in screenwriting and film directing from the ArtCenter College of Design in Pasadena, California. In 2010, she founded Cinephilia Productions, a New York-based film incubator and production company.

Career
Hotait's short film, I Say Dust, starring Hala Alyan and Mounia Akl, premiered at Outfest in 2015. The film was banned from screening in some Arab countries for portraying a kiss between two women on screen. In 2018, her short film, Like Salt, starring Jessica Damouni and Ben Williams, received the Best Film Award at the Oscar-qualifying Reel Sisters of the Diaspora Festival. In 2019, she received the New York State Council on the Arts Individual Artist Award.

In 2021, Hotait released her film, Tallahassee starring Cherien Dabis, Hala Alyan, and Samia Halaby, premiered at the 10th Blackstar Film Festival and was released exclusively by The New Yorker in January 2022. She directed the music video of Grammy-nominated album 'ONA' by singer Thana Alexa, premiered on Forbes. In 2022, She released her film Sherman, starring Zainab Jah, premiered at the 30th Pan African Film Festival.

Filmography

Films

Music video

Awards and nominations

References

External links
 
 

Year of birth missing (living people)
Living people
American film directors
21st-century American women writers
Lebanese